FC Wels is an Austrian association football club founded in 2003 by the merger of the traditional clubs SK Eintracht Wels and FC Union Wels. It plays in the fourth-tier OÖ Liga. The club is based in the city of Wels.

Current squad

Staff and board members

 Trainer:  Hans-Peter Buchleitner
 Co-Trainer: Gerald Baumgartner
 Physio:  Ernst Leutgöb
 President:  Silvia Huber
 Vice President:  Peter Koits
 Vice Chairman:  Johann Mutschlechner

References

External links
 http://www.fcwels.at/  Official Website

Association football clubs established in 2003
Wels,FC
Wels
2003 establishments in Austria